The Ipitinga River is a river of Pará state in north-central Brazil, a tributary of the Jari River.

Part of the river's basin is in the Maicuru Biological Reserve.

See also
List of rivers of Pará

References

Brazilian Ministry of Transport

Rivers of Pará